Biktimirovo (Biktimer) is a rural locality (a village) in Nikolsky Selsoviet, Krasnokamsky District, Bashkortostan, Russia. The population was 6 as of 2010. There is 1 street.

Geography 
Biktimirovo is located 30 km northeast of Nikolo-Beryozovka (the district's administrative centre) by road. Nikolskoye is the nearest rural locality.

References 

Rural localities in Krasnokamsky District